Centennial Airlines was an airline based in Palma de Mallorca, Spain.

History
Centennial Airlines was founded in 1993. It operated charter services from its base in Mallorca using  McDonnell Douglas MD-83 aircraft.

Owing to fierce competition from other airlines that pushed charter fares down, the airline's relatively small size compared to its Northern European competitors and the lack of significant numbers of passenger bookings during the winter season, Centennial Airlines soon faced serious financial difficulties. Centennial Airlines went bankrupt in 1995 and ceased operations in 1996.

An investigation regarding the apparent fraudulent bankruptcy of the company followed. The accused were the former administrators of Centennial Airlines SA, including its Honorary President, Francisco Carrión Orfila, a prestigious Spanish entrepreneur and former owner of the Menorca-based El Caserío cream cheese factory. Carrión was later acquitted of all charges.

Code data
ICAO code: CNA (not current)

Fleet
9 McDonnell Douglas MD-83

References

External links

Airline history; Spain

Airlines established in 1993
Airlines disestablished in 1996
Defunct airlines of Spain
Transport in the Balearic Islands
Spanish companies established in 1993
1996 disestablishments in Spain